The Gave d'Aspe is a torrential river flowing through the Aspe Valley, one of the three main valleys of the High-Béarn (Pyrénées-Atlantiques), in the southwest of France.

It is formed in the Aspe Cirque, below the Aspe peak, elevation , in Spain.

After joining the Gave d'Ossau, in Oloron-Sainte-Marie, it forms the Gave d'Oloron.

Main tributaries 
 (R) Arnousse
 (L) Gave de Baralet
 (R) Sescouet
 (L) Gave de Bélonce
 (R) Escuarpe, in Cette-Eygun
 (L) Gave de Lescun
 (R) Berthe, from Accous
 (L) Malugar, from Athas
 (L) Arricq d'Osse
 (R) Gabarret, aka Gave d'Aydius
 (R) Barrescou, from the Marie-Blanque Pass
 (L) Lourdios
 (R) Ourtau

Départements and towns
 Pyrénées-Atlantiques:

References

Rivers of France
Rivers of Pyrénées-Atlantiques
Rivers of Nouvelle-Aquitaine